The Order of Independence (Wisam al-Istiqial) is the fourth knighthood order of the Kingdom of Jordan.

History 
It was instituted in 1921 by Emir Hussein bin Ali, Sharif of Mecca.

Grades 
The Order of Independence is divided in five classes:

Insignia 
The ribbon is purple with white and black stripes on its borders.

Notable recipients 

Senior members of the Jordanian Royal Family as well as Prime Ministers of Jordan are among the current recipients of the Order's highest rank of Grand Cordon.  Others include foreign royalty, prominent businessmen and cultural figures.

Grand Cordon
 B. J. Habibie, President of Indonesia
 L. B. Moerdani, Commander of the Indonesian National Armed Forces
 Jaime de Marichalar, Infanta Elena, Duchess of Lugo's former husband.
 Simeon II, King of the Bulgarians and Prime Minister.
 Anthony Bailey, interfaith campaigner.
 Waleed bin Ibrahim Al Ibrahim, Saudi businessman and media figure.
 Halbi Mohd Yussof, Minister of Brunei
 Yasmin Umar, Minister of Brunei
 Hashemite University, received the order of Independence of first class.
Edraak.org, received the order of Independence of first class.
 Amer Khammash
 Bisher Al-Khasawneh

Grand Officer
 Faisal Al-Fayez, Prime Minister
 Kathleen Kenyon, British archaeologist
 Air Chief Marshal Anwar Shamim (Chief of Air Staff Pakistan Air Force 1978-1986)

Commander
 General Zia-ul-Haq (President of Pakistan 1978-88); Awarded for his role in crushing the Palestinian rebels during Black September 1970
 Air Commodore Zafar Masud (Pakistan Air Force); Base Commander, PAF Base Sargodha during the 1965 War

Sources 
Medals World Index, Jordan: Order of Independence (Wisam al-Istiqial)

References 

 
Independence (Jordan), Order of
Independence (Jordan), Order of
Awards established in 1921
1921 establishments in Asia